Keratan-sulfate endo-1,4-beta-galactosidase (endo-beta-galactosidase, keratan sulfate endogalactosidase, keratanase, keratan-sulfate 1,4-beta-D-galactanohydrolase) is an enzyme with systematic name keratan-sulfate 4-beta-D-galactanohydrolase. This enzyme catalyses the following chemical reaction

 Endohydrolysis of (1->4)-beta-D-galactosidic linkages in keratan sulfate

Hydrolyses the 1,4-beta-D-galactosyl linkages adjacent to 1,3-N-acetyl-alpha-D-glucosaminyl residues.

References

External links 
 

EC 3.2.1